Pit Beirer (born 19 October 1972) is a German former professional motocross racer and current Motorsports Director for the KTM motorcycle company. He competed in the Motocross World Championships from 1989 to 2003.

Motocross racing career
Born in Radolfzell, Baden-Württemberg, Beirer was one of the top competitors in the FIM  250cc World Championships riding for Honda and Kawasaki. He finished third in the 250 world championship in 1997, 1998, 2000 and 2002. He finished second to Frédéric Bolley in the 1999 250cc motocross world championship. Beirer signed with KTM in 2002, but in 2003, he crashed during the Bulgarian Grand Prix and suffered spinal injuries that left him paralyzed and ended his riding career.

Racing team management
After rehabilitation, Beirer became the head of KTM's off-road racing department. He is currently the Motorsports Director for KTM overseeing the Red Bull KTM Factory Racing team in MotoGP as well as their off-road racing programs.

References

External links 
 Pit Beirer home page

1972 births
Living people
People from Radolfzell
Sportspeople from Freiburg (region)
German motocross riders
People with paraplegia
German disabled sportspeople